Club Guaraní is a Paraguayan football team, based in the neighbourhood of Pinozá in outer Asunción. Founded on 12 October 1903, it is one of the oldest and one of the most successful in the country, with eleven Primera División titles, and has never been relegated to a lower division.

History
Club Guaraní is the second oldest Paraguayan football club. It was founded in 1903 under the name of "Football Club Guaraní" and its first president was Juan Patri. The name of the club derives from the Guaraní people, a big part of Paraguayan culture and history. The colours of the club, black and yellow, were proposed by the Melina brothers (also among the founders of the club) in reference to the colours of Uruguayan club Peñarol, where the Melina brothers played for a few years. The mentioned colors were also used by English privateer Francis Drake in his emblem and shield, which is another reason why they were chosen to represent the club.

Guaraní is one of the traditional teams from the Paraguayan football league and during their history they have won a total of ten championships and were runners-up in fourteen occasions. The most successful era in their history was in the 1960s, where they had an excellent team that won three titles. This era is known as the "golden decade" by the Guaraní fans.

Along with Olimpia, they play the "clásico añejo" (the oldest derby) because they are the two oldest teams from Paraguay. Also, Guaraní, Cerro Porteño and Olimpia are the only teams that have never played in the second division of the Paraguayan league.

In late May 2010, Guaraní became champions after 26 years after defeating Olimpia in a match that ended 2–1 to clinch the 2010 Apertura title.

Youth
One of the club's youth teams played at the 2008 Torneo di Viareggio, the 2010 Torneo di Viareggio, the 2012 Torneo di Viareggio and the 2014 Torneo di Viareggio.

Honours
Primera División: (11)
1906, 1907, 1921, 1923, 1949, 1964, 1967, 1969, 1984, 2010 Apertura, 2016 Clausura
Copa Paraguay (1): 2018

Players

First-team squad

Notable players
To appear in this section a player must have either:
 Played at least 125 games for the club.
 Set a club record or won an individual award while at the club.
 Been part of a national team at any time.
 Played in the first division of any other football association (outside of Paraguay).
 Played in a continental and/or intercontinental competition.

1980s
 José Luis Chilavert (1984)
2000s
 Aldo Barreto (2003–04)
 Aureliano Torres (2004–06)
 Federico Santander (2008–10), (2011–12), (2013–15)
2010s
 Marcelo Palau (2012), (2014–)
 Julio César Cáceres (2013–)
 Fernando Fernández (2013–15)
 César Caicedo (2014)

Non-CONMEBOL players
 Kenji Fukuda (2004)
 Yuki Tamura (2010)

Average attendance

Managerial information

Championship winning managers

References

External links

Club Guaraní Official Site
Unofficial Site

 
Football clubs in Paraguay
Football clubs in Asunción
Association football clubs established in 1903
1903 establishments in Paraguay